Plymstock is a commuter suburb of Plymouth and former civil parish in the English county of Devon.

Geography

Situated on the east bank of the River Plym, Plymstock is geographically and historically part of the South Hams. It comprises the villages Billacombe, Elburton, Goosewell, Hooe, Mount Batten, Oreston, Pomphlett, Staddiscombe, Turnchapel and Plymstock proper, the centrally located village after which the parish and suburb is named. The parish church is St Mary and All Saints.

The pedestrianised 1960s Broadway consists of a number of shops, including an Iceland supermarket within the precinct and a Lidl supermarket nearby, three banks, six estate agents' and other local amenities including a library, a fire station and a small police station.

At Pomphlett, there is a Morrisons superstore and drive-through McDonald's burger restaurant. The population at the time of the 2001 Census was recorded at 24,103 with 11,652 owner occupied homes in the PL9 area. The total population in 2011 increased to 24,758

History
The earliest surviving documentary reference to the place is as Plemestocha in the Domesday Book and its name is derived from Old English meaning either "outlying farm with a plum-tree" or, if it is short for Plympton Stock, "outlying farm belonging to Plympton".

The local branch railways through the area to Turnchapel and Yealmpton have been removed, the bridges and stations demolished, and the land built on. Pomphlett Mill has been demolished and the site used for a roundabout. Pomphlett Creek (shown right), once a popular rowing stretch has been partly filled in and what remains is largely silted up.

Until the 20th century Plymstock was a rural parish but began to develop rapidly just before and after the Second World War as a residential area outside Plymouth but acting as a dormitory area for the city. On 1 April 1967, Plymstock, along with Plympton, was absorbed into the City of Plymouth and today, like Plympton, forms a populous and mostly home-owning south-eastern suburb of the city.

The area as part of the South West Devon constituency invariably returns a Tory MP reflecting with Plympton a more right-wing community than the rest of the city.

Amenities

There are numerous public spaces including a huge public sports area at Staddiscombe. There are three rugby pitches at Elburton, there is a major golf club at Staddon Heights and a commercial driving range near Elburton.

There are many state primary schools in the area and two very large comprehensive schools, Coombe Dean School and Plymstock School. There are no local independent school options, although children who chose to take and get a very high pass in the 11+ exam can attend one of the three grammar schools in Plymouth.

In 2008, Coombe Dean School achieved national notoriety after a popular school plan to erect two generating windmills was blocked by local councillors following opposition by residents of surrounding bungalows.

Frequent buses connect most areas of Plymstock with routes across the city linking with the railway station and Derriford hospital. There is a water taxi linking Mount Batten with Plymouth Barbican.

Folklore

Childe's Tomb on Dartmoor is the legendary site of the death of Childe who, caught in a snowstorm, killed and disembowelled his horse and climbed inside for shelter, but still froze to death. He left a message to say that the first person to bury him would get his lands at Plymstock. The greedy monks of Tavistock buried him and claimed the lands. The ghosts of monks carrying a bier have supposedly been seen at Childe's Tomb.

References

Suburbs of Plymouth, Devon
Former civil parishes in Devon